The 2017–18 Midland Football League season was the 4th in the history of the Midland Football League, a football competition in England.

Premier Division

The Premier Division featured 17 clubs which competed in the previous season, along with five new clubs:
 Bromsgrove Sporting, promoted from Division One
 Haughmond, promoted from the West Midlands (Regional) League
 Rugby Town, relegated from the Northern Premier League
 South Normanton Athletic, promoted from the East Midlands Counties League
 Worcester City, voluntarily demoted from the National League North

League table

Stadia and locations

Division One

Division One featured 17 clubs which competed in the previous season, along with five new clubs.
Two clubs relegated from the Premier Division:
Brocton
Walsall Wood

Two clubs promoted from Division Two:
Coventry Alvis, with a name change from Alvis Sporting Club
Paget Rangers

Plus:
Ilkeston Town, new club formed after Ilkeston folded

League table

Stadia and locations

Division Two 

Division Two featured eleven clubs which competed in the division last season, along with five new clubs:
Pelsall Villa, relegated from Division One 
NKF Burbage, promoted from Division Three
Montpellier, promoted from Division Three
Northfield Town, promoted from Division Three
Moors Academy, promoted from Division Three

League table

Division Three

Division Three featured nine clubs which competed in the division last season, along with seven new clubs:
Bartestree, joined from the Herefordshire County League
Birmingham Tigers, joined from the Birmingham & District League
CT Shush, joined from the Birmingham & District League
Central Ajax, joined from the Stratford on Avon Alliance
Continental Star, relegated from Division Two
GNP Sports, joined from the Coventry Alliance
Leamington Hibs, relegated from Division Two

League table

References

External links
 Midland Football League

2017–18
9